Michael James McMahon (29 July 1889 – c. 1961) was a rugby union player who represented Australia.

McMahon, a fullback, claimed 1 international rugby cap for Australia.

References

                   

Australian rugby union players
Australia international rugby union players
1889 births
1960s deaths
Rugby union fullbacks